Coleburn railway station served the area of Coleburn, Moray, Scotland from 1863 to 1926 on the Morayshire Railway.

History 
The station opened on 5 June 1863 as Coleburn's Platform by the Great North of Scotland Railway. . The station closed for regular passenger service in April 1867 but remained available as a private station with trains stopping on request. It closed again for good in July 1926.

References

External links 

Disused railway stations in Moray
Former Great North of Scotland Railway stations
Railway stations in Great Britain opened in 1863
Railway stations in Great Britain closed in 1926
1863 establishments in Scotland
1926 disestablishments in Scotland